British Rail Class D2/1 was a locomotive commissioned by British Rail in England. It was a diesel powered locomotive in the pre-TOPS period built by the North British Locomotive Company with a Paxman engine. Eight locomotives were built and they were numbered D2700-D2707.

River Eden the shunter at RAF Leuchars was built to the same specification as the D2/1 and is preserved at Fife Heritage Railway.

See also
 List of British Rail classes

References

Sources
 

D002.01
NBL locomotives
B locomotives
Railway locomotives introduced in 1953
Standard gauge locomotives of Great Britain
Scrapped locomotives